Knox Township is a township in Clearfield County, Pennsylvania,  United States.  As of the 2020 United States Census, the population was 599.

Geography

Communities
Boardman
Carnwath
Erhard
Kellytown
New Millport
O'Shanter
Oak Ridge

Demographics

As of the census of 2000, there were 705 people, 295 households, and 215 families residing in the township. The population density was 27.9 people per square mile (10.8/km). There were 356 housing units at an average density of 14.1/sq mi (5.4/km). The racial makeup of the township was 99.57% White, 0.14% Native American, and 0.28% from two or more races. Hispanic or Latino of any race were 0.14% of the population.

There were 295 households, out of which 28.1% had children under the age of 18 living with them, 63.4% were married couples living together, 6.8% had a female householder with no husband present, and 27.1% were non-families. 24.4% of all households were made up of individuals, and 11.2% had someone living alone who was 65 years of age or older. The average household size was 2.39 and the average family size was 2.80.

In the township the population was spread out, with 23.1% under the age of 18, 7.7% from 18 to 24, 26.1% from 25 to 44, 29.5% from 45 to 64, and 13.6% who were 65 years of age or older. The median age was 40 years. For every 100 females, there were 106.7 males. For every 100 females age 18 and over, there were 106.9 males.

The median income for a household in the township was $26,583, and the median income for a family was $30,217. Males had a median income of $26,029 versus $17,222 for females. The per capita income for the township was $13,394. About 11.5% of families and 15.2% of the population were below the poverty line, including 21.7% of those under age 18 and 12.0% of those age 65 or over.

Education
Students in Knox Township attend schools in the Clearfield Area School District.

Bloody Knox

The township was also the site of the anti-civil war resistance known as Bloody Knox.  There the log cabin home of Tom Adams was host to a shootout between draft deserters and anti-war residents.  In the end, two men were killed and several arrested.

References

External links

Populated places established in 1806
Townships in Clearfield County, Pennsylvania
Townships in Pennsylvania